The New Democratic Party of Quebec (NPDQ) is a federalist and social-democratic provincial political party in Quebec, Canada. The party is a revival of the comparable Nouveau Parti Démocratique du Québec, which existed in various forms as the federal New Democratic Party (NDP)'s provincial affiliate in Quebec from 1963 to 1991. The current party, however, is not affiliated with the federal NDP. The modern party was registered on 30 January 2014.

History

First iteration

The original New Democratic Party of Quebec emerged from the Parti social démocratique du Québec, the Quebec section of the Cooperative Commonwealth Federation. Aside from briefly holding a single seat in the National Assembly (David Côté), it only played a minor role in Quebec provincial politics. During the late 1980s, it came under the leadership of radical sovereigntists, prompting a rupture from the federal NDP. It voted to disaffiliate from the federal party in 1989 and changed its name to the Parti de la democratie socialiste (PDS) in 1994. The PDS would later become a founding member of Québec solidaire, a left-wing provincial party with a sovereigntist platform.

Second iteration
For the following two decades, the NDP remained moribund in Quebec; indeed, it was the only province where the NDP was not fully organized. Unlike other national parties in Canada, the NDP is fully integrated with its provincial and territorial branches.

During the 2006 convention of the federal NDP, held in Quebec City, the idea of recreating the provincial NPDQ was brought up. However, the idea failed to win support at the New Democratic Party-Quebec Section's convention in November 2006 in Saint-Jérôme. However, gains by the federal party— at first modest with the 2007 by-election in which Tom Mulcair gained the House of Commons seat in Outremont and then dramatic "Orange Surge" of the 2011 Canadian federal election— led to renewed calls for a provincial NDP in Quebec as an alternative to the federalist Quebec Liberal Party and the sovereigntist Parti Quebecois.

On August 17, 2012, federal NDP leader Mulcair announced that, while the NDP was unable to organize for the (then on-going) 2012 election, the NDP intended to run candidates in the next provincial election (then tentatively scheduled for 2016). However, by November 2012, Mulcair had changed his mind, believing that dividing the party's efforts between federal and provincial politics would be "extremely perilous." The president of the Quebec Section, André St-Hilaire, agreed with his concerns, arguing their first priority was electing a federal NDP government.

Nevertheless, NDP activists remained interested in establishing a provincial party. On April 29, 2013, the name "Nouveau Parti démocratique du Québec" was reserved with the Directeur général des élections du Québec (DGEQ) by Pierre Ducasse, Jack Layton's former Quebec lieutenant. Ducasse said it was "not in the plans" to have a structural link to the federal party, and the NDP's deputy national director confirmed they were not involved in reserving the name. On January 30, 2014, the New Democratic Party of Quebec was registered as a provincial party with the DGEQ. Ducasse was listed as the party leader. The party did not stand any candidates in the general election later that year.

The first election the NPDQ contested was the October 2, 2017 by-election in Louis-Hébert. Their candidate, former MP Denis Blanchette, placed seventh with 1.35% of the vote.

Interim leader Pierre Ducasse had announced he would not be a candidate in the party's 2018 leadership election. The campaign period began on 1 September 2017 and the nomination deadline for leadership candidates was 20 October 2017. On 21 January 2018, the party leadership contest elected Raphaël Fortin was chosen leader.

2018 campaign: Re-establishing the party
For the 2018 provincial election, the NPDQ sought to re-establish a presence in the province by running a small campaign that focused on Fortin as leader. Able to run 59 candidates across the province, the party aimed to influence the discussion and gain attention for a party that had not been present in the province for over two decades. Fortin, speaking with media, said that he had instructed his candidates to not, “look at the final results; look at your campaign and how many people you reach.”

During the campaign, the NPDQ maintained similar policies to those of Québec Solidaire, such as supporting a guaranteed minimum income and universal daycare and post-secondary, though it asserted it was a staunchly federalist party.

Federal New Democratic leader Jagmeet Singh did not endorse the provincial party during the campaign.

Election results

Leaders of the NPD-Québec
 Pierre Ducasse (2014–2018) (as interim leader)
 Raphaël Fortin (2018–present)

See also
 2018 New Democratic Party of Quebec leadership election
 Politics of Quebec
 List of Quebec general elections
 National Assembly of Quebec
 Timeline of Quebec history
 List of political parties in Quebec

References

External links
  
 National Assembly historical information
 La Politique québécoise sur le Web

 
Quebec
Provincial political parties in Quebec
Political parties established in 2014
2014 establishments in Quebec